Valentín Loren (born 26 August 1946) is a Spanish boxer. He competed in the men's featherweight event at the 1964 Summer Olympics. At the 1964 Summer Olympics, he lost to Hsu Hung-cheng of Taiwan by disqualification in the Round of 32.

References

External links
 

1946 births
Living people
Spanish male boxers
Olympic boxers of Spain
Boxers at the 1964 Summer Olympics
Place of birth missing (living people)
Featherweight boxers